The grey-brown white-eye or Pohnpei white-eye (Zosterops ponapensis) is a species of bird in the family Zosteropidae. It is endemic to Pohnpei.

This species and the Kosrae white-eye were formerly considered conspecific.

Its natural habitat is subtropical or tropical moist lowland forest.

References

grey-brown white-eye
Birds of Pohnpei
grey-brown white-eye
Taxonomy articles created by Polbot